Toe Tag is an Estonian hip hop group originally from Kalamaja, Tallinn. It consists of rappers G-Enka (Henry Kõrvits) and DJ Paul Oja. Toe Tag was established in 1996. In August 2011, rapper Revo (Revo Jõgisalu) died from skin cancer.

References

External links
 

Estonian hip hop groups
Musical groups established in 1996